Ricardo Gouveia (born 6 August 1991) is a Portuguese professional golfer.

Gouveia played college golf at Lynn University and the University of Central Florida. He played on the winning European team in the Palmer Cup in 2014.

Gouveia turned professional in 2014 and plays on the Challenge Tour. He won his first tournament in his seventh start, playing on an invitation, at the EMC Golf Challenge Open in October 2014.

Gouveia has featured in the Top 100 Official World Golf Ranking, reaching a height of 77th in 2016.

Professional wins (5)

Challenge Tour wins (5)

1Co-sanctioned by the Nordic Golf League

Challenge Tour playoff record (1–0)

Team appearances
Amateur
European Boys' Team Championship (representing Portugal): 2005, 2006, 2007, 2008
European Amateur Team Championship (representing Portugal): 2007, 2008, 2011, 2013
Palmer Cup (representing Europe): 2014 (winners)

Professional
World Cup (representing Portugal): 2016

See also
2015 Challenge Tour graduates
2021 Challenge Tour graduates
List of golfers with most Challenge Tour wins

References

External links

Portuguese male golfers
Lynn Fighting Knights men's golfers
UCF Knights men's golfers
European Tour golfers
Olympic golfers of Portugal
Golfers at the 2016 Summer Olympics
Sportspeople from Lisbon
1991 births
Living people